Veselkin (from весёлый meaning cheerful) is a Russian masculine surname, its feminine counterpart is Veselkina. It may refer to
Alexei Veselkin (born 1961), Russian actor and TV game show presenter
Igor Veselkin (1915–1997), Russian realist painter, graphic artist and scenographer

Russian-language surnames